Ronald A. Parsons Jr. is an American attorney who served as the United States Attorney for the District of South Dakota from 2018 to 2021.

Early life and education
Parsons Jr. graduated with a Bachelor of Arts from the University of Minnesota in 1994 and then a Juris Doctor with Sterling honors from the University of South Dakota School of Law in 1997.

Legal career
Following law school, Parsons worked as a judicial law clerk for the Honorable Roger Leland Wollman, Chief Judge of the United States Court of Appeals for the Eighth Circuit. He then went into private practice at Johnson, Janklow, Abdallah, Reiter and Parsons, LLP in Sioux Falls, South Dakota.

United States Attorney
He was nominated by President Donald Trump on July 27, 2017, to be the United States Attorney for the District of South Dakota. He was confirmed by the United States Senate on December 20, 2017. He was sworn into office on January 5, 2018.

On February 8, 2021, he along with 55 other Trump-era attorneys were asked to resign. He submitted his resignation on February 22, effective February 26.

Post U.S. Attorney Career
After being U.S. Attorney, Parsons went to work for Sioux Falls law firm Johnson Abdallah Janklow & Reiter LLP.

See also
United States Attorney for the District of South Dakota
University of South Dakota School of Law

References

External links
Meet the U.S. Attorney

Living people
University of Minnesota alumni
University of South Dakota School of Law alumni
21st-century American lawyers
South Dakota lawyers
United States Attorneys for the District of South Dakota
1967 births